Germanicus Young Tigner (1856–1938) served in the Georgia State legislature in 1888 and 1889 and from 1902 to 1904. He served as a judge in Columbus, Georgia from 1909 to 1912.

Early life and education
Germanicus was born on October 2, 1856 in Haralson, Coweta County, Georgia. Son of Senator William Archelaus Tigner and Eugenia R Tigner (née Dozier). He was educated in private schools in Jonesboro and Atlanta.

Legal career

Stenography
Germanicus was made official stenographer of the Chattahoochee County Circuit in 1876, holding this position until 1892. In 1898 he was appointed as stenographer to the Supreme Court of Georgia.

Lawyer
He was admitted to the bar in 1889.

Judge
He was appointed as judge to the City Court of Columbus on January 1, 1909.

Marriage and family
Germanicus was married to Johnny Lindsay on June 27, 1889 in Columbus, Georgia. The couple had two children: Helen (December 22, 1891 – March 10, 1910) and John (September 28, 1894 – September 4, 1911).

References

American judges
1856 births
1938 deaths
People from Columbus, Georgia
People from Muscogee County, Georgia
Georgia (U.S. state) lawyers
Members of the Georgia House of Representatives
People from Coweta County, Georgia
People from Jonesboro, Georgia